Darrel Crutchfield (born February 26, 1979) was an American football defensive back. 

Crutchfield was born in 1979 in San Diego. He attended William M. Raines High School in Jacksonville, Florida.

He attended Clemson University and played for Clemson Tigers football team from 1997 to 2000. 

After college, Crutchfield played professional football in the National Football League (NFL) for the Philadelphia Eagles (NFL). He appeared in four games for the Eagles during the 2001 season. 

He also played in the Canadian Football League for the Edmonton Eskimos from 2002 to 2004 and the Montreal Alouettes from 2005 to 2006. appeared in 17 games for the 2003 Edmonton Eskimos team that compiled a 13–5 record and won the 91st Grey Cup. He appeared in a total of 59 CFL games. He gained attention in 2005 for his efforts to sell his Grey Cup championship ring.

References

1979 births
Living people
Philadelphia Eagles players
Edmonton Elks players
Clemson Tigers football players
American football defensive backs
Players of American football from Florida
Sportspeople from Jacksonville, Florida